"Picky" is a song by Panamanian singer Joey Montana. It was released on June 23, 2015 as the second single from Montana's fourth studio album Picky Back to the Roots (2016).

Chart performance 
"Picky" reached number one in Mexico, on the Mexico Airplay chart issue dated May 14, 2016. The song displaced Spanish Latin pop singer Enrique Iglesias's "Duele el Corazón" from the top of the chart. "Picky" also peaked at number two in Spain, at number 11 in his native Panama, and at number 15 on the US Hot Latin Songs, becoming Montana's breakthrough song.

As of May 2020, the song's music video has over 1.25 billion views on YouTube.

Remixes 
Joey Montana released three remixes of the song, all featuring Akon and Mohombi, on March 11, 2016.

Charts

Weekly charts

Year-end charts

Certifications

See also
 List of number-one songs of 2016 (Mexico)

References 

2015 singles
2015 songs
Joey Montana songs
Capitol Latin singles
Spanish-language songs